The Orem Utah Temple is a temple of the Church of Jesus Christ of Latter-day Saints under construction in Orem, Utah. Plans to construct a temple in Orem were announced on October 5, 2019 by church president Russell M. Nelson, during the Saturday Women's Session of General Conference. The Orem Utah Temple will be the first in the city of Orem, the sixth in Utah County and the 22nd in the state of Utah.

On December 11, 2019, the church announced it would be built on a 16-acre site owned by the church.  The site is south of the University Parkway exit of Interstate 15 on Geneva Road, near the Orem UTA Frontrunner station. Plans for the temple indicated that it will be a three-story, 70,000 square foot building. The church also anticipates construction of a 20,000 square foot meetinghouse on the same property.

On June 24, 2020, the church announced that the groundbreaking for the temple would be held on September 5, 2020. Craig C. Christensen, president of the church's Utah Area, presided at the ceremony. It is anticipated construction will take three years, with completion expected by fall of 2023.

On July 25, 2022, a fire broke out in a utility room on the third floor of the temple. The Orem Fire Department put out the fire using mostly foam to limit water damage to the structure. On September 6, the Bureau of Alcohol, Tobacco, Firearms and Explosives announced the fire was being investigated as an arson, and offered a cash reward for information leading to the arrest and conviction of those responsible.

See also

 The Church of Jesus Christ of Latter-day Saints in Utah
 Comparison of temples of The Church of Jesus Christ of Latter-day Saints
 List of temples of The Church of Jesus Christ of Latter-day Saints
 List of temples of The Church of Jesus Christ of Latter-day Saints by geographic region
 Temple architecture (Latter-day Saints)

References

External links
 Orem Utah Temple Official site
 Orem Utah Temple at ChurchofJesusChristTemples.org

Temples (LDS Church) in Utah
Orem, Utah